Pai Hsiao-ma (born 7 May 1986), formerly known as Pai Min-jie, is a Taiwanese badminton player. She competed at the 2006, 2010 and 2014 Asian Games.

Achievements

Summer Universiade 
Women's singles

Women's doubles

World University Championships 
Women's singles

Women's doubles

BWF Grand Prix (1 title) 
The BWF Grand Prix had two levels, the BWF Grand Prix and Grand Prix Gold. It was a series of badminton tournaments sanctioned by the Badminton World Federation (BWF) which was held from 2007 to 2017.

Women's singles

  BWF Grand Prix Gold tournament
  BWF Grand Prix tournament

BWF International Challenge/Series (3 titles, 1 runner-up) 
Women's singles

  BWF International Challenge tournament
  BWF International Series tournament

References

External links 
 
 

1986 births
Living people
Taiwanese female badminton players
Badminton players at the 2006 Asian Games
Badminton players at the 2010 Asian Games
Badminton players at the 2014 Asian Games
Universiade medalists in badminton
Universiade silver medalists for Chinese Taipei
Universiade bronze medalists for Chinese Taipei
Asian Games competitors for Chinese Taipei
Medalists at the 2007 Summer Universiade
Medalists at the 2011 Summer Universiade
Medalists at the 2013 Summer Universiade
21st-century Taiwanese women